The 2000 South African motorcycle Grand Prix was the first round of the 2000 Grand Prix motorcycle racing season. It took place on 19 March 2000 at Phakisa Freeway.

500cc race report
This race was most notable for the shock win of WCM rider Garry McCoy. Initially, many thought that it would be 1999 500cc world champion Àlex Crivillé who would win the race, mainly thanks to the pole he had obtained on Saturday. This race also marked the first ever 500cc race of Valentino Rossi.

At the start of the race, Kenny Roberts Jr. on his Suzuki, overtook Crivillé at the start to lead the opening lap, followed by the Yamaha of Carlos Checa. Crivillé would drop down to 7th, whilst Tadayuki Okada moved up to third, closely followed by Loris Capirossi who would swap places with each other a few times on the opening lap. McCoy at that time was only in 8th place, and Rossi in 13th after a bad opening lap.

After a few laps, Checa would overtake Kenny Roberts Jr. for the lead, and not long after that Capirossi would follow suit. McCoy dropped to 9th place, with Valentino Rossi behind him.

On the 5th lap, Capirossi overtook Checa to lead the race, and after 12 laps, both Max Biaggi and Valentino Rossi were out of the race; Biaggi because of technical problems, and Rossi because of a crash.

With the laps closing down, McCoy overtook multiple people to reach third place. Sete Gibernau also overtook Kenny Roberts to go on and finish in what would be 4th place, but ran wide and eventually retired. Not much later, Crivillé would end up overtaking Roberts Jr. as well.

With 5 laps to go, McCoy overtook the Honda of Capirossi and went up into second place. A few corners later, he overtook the other Yamaha of Checa to lead the race. He held off a late charge from Checa and would come home to win the race with 0.366 seconds difference: the first 500cc race of his career.

This was the first race to be won by an Australian since the 1998 Argentine motorcycle Grand Prix who was won by Mick Doohan.

500 cc classification

250 cc classification

125 cc classification

Championship standings after the race (500cc)

Below are the standings for the top five riders and constructors after round one has concluded.

Riders' Championship standings

Constructors' Championship standings

 Note: Only the top five positions are included for both sets of standings.

References

South African motorcycle Grand Prix
South African
Motorcycle Grand Prix
March 2000 sports events in Africa